Mark Willis (born June 11, 1969) is an American businessman, politician, and former United States Army counterintelligence agent from Dennysville, Maine. Running as a Republican, he ran for Republican National Committee Chair in 2013, losing to Reince Priebus.

Early life and education
Born in Alameda County, California to Marilyn (née Burgesen) and Glenn Willis, Mark is the elder of two children. His sister is two years younger than he. He grew up in Paradise, California, graduating from Paradise High School in 1987.

He earned a Bachelor of Arts degree in international relations from California State University, Chico. He went on to garner his Master of Science in Management Information Systems at Bowie State University in Maryland, and a Juris Doctor from George Mason University School of Law.

Military service
Willis was a counterintelligence agent in the United States Army from 1993 to 1999, serving in Haiti as well as Bosnia.

He worked with the United States Army Intelligence and Security Command (INSCOM) from 1999 to 2008. During that time, from 2000 until 2005, he served as an information technology liaison between INSCOM and the National Security Agency (NSA) personnel divisions.

He has been an application security manager and analyst for a Fortune 100 company from 2009 until the present time.

Personal life
Willis and his wife, Violet, own Kilby Ridge Farm, in Dennysville. They raise Icelandic sheep, heritage poultry, and heirloom vegetables. They have been married eighteen years and have two children. Their son, Declan, is 12, and their daughter, Brynne, is 4.

Politics
Willis served the Maine Republican Party as the Dennysville Town Chair and is also on the Dennysville School Board. He was a member of the Maine Republican Liberty Caucus and has been endorsed by the National Republican Liberty Caucus. Other endorsements have come from Lambda Legal, the National Rifle Association, Maine's Tea Party.

In 2013, Willis announced his intention to run for the chairmanship of the Republican National Committee, pledging to identify and support other libertarian and constitutionalist candidates if successful. He also advocated for the abolition of the Transportation Security Administration (TSA) and the repeal of Section 1021 of the NDAA.

Willis was a Ron Paul delegate for the State of Maine in the 2012 Republican National Convention, during which the RNC removed half of that delegation. Willis and the delegation staged a walkout from the convention when their appeals were denied.

Objections to the 2012 RNC Rules Changes
Willis has criticized the rules adopted by the RNC, particularly Rules 12, 16, and 40, which were instituted in what many believe to be a dubious manner during the 2012 Republican National Convention in Tampa.

Rule 12 allows members of the Republican National Committee to amend the party's rules (except for Rule 12 itself) at any time, rather than during national conventions, as had previously been the case. To do so requires a three-quarters vote of the body of the RNC.

Rule 16 forces individual state Republican Party committees to use statewide "presidential preference polls," such as straw polls or primaries, to determine which candidate delegates will be bound to. This is counter to many of the states' procedures.

Rule 16 also allows the presumptive presidential candidate to disavow or veto any bound or allocated delegate for any reason whatsoever. In other words, the candidate who is most likely to win the vote at the convention will be allowed to remove delegates who are likely to vote for other candidates. This is to be done before the presumptive candidate is elected.

Rule 40 removes the former requirement for a plurality of five states in order to nominate a candidate for president and/or vice president and replaces that requirement with the requirement of a majority of eight states.

2013 Election of the RNC Chair
After a grassroots organization called for Priebus to step down and collected nominations from readers, Mark Willis, the front runner, agreed to run for RNC Chair if he were nominated.

The election of the RNC Chair was held on January 25, 2013, and won by Priebus.

Resignation from the Republican Party 
In August 2013, Willis, until then a member of the Republican National Committee, was one of thirteen Maine Republicans to resign en masse from the Republican Party, saying, "We can no longer associate ourselves with a political party that goes out of its way to continually restrict our freedoms and liberties as well as reaching deeper and deeper into our wallets."

References

1969 births
Living people
Maine Republicans
People from Paradise, California
California State University, Chico alumni
Bowie State University alumni
Antonin Scalia Law School alumni
People from Washington County, Maine